Ching King is one of the 39 constituencies in the Yuen Long District of Hong Kong.

The constituency returns one district councillor to the Yuen Long District Council, with an election every four years. Ching King constituency is loosely based on part of Tin Ching Estate and Vianni Cove in Tin Shui Wai with estimated population of 19,077.

Councillors represented

Election results

2010s

References

Tin Shui Wai
Constituencies of Hong Kong
Constituencies of Yuen Long District Council
2011 establishments in Hong Kong
Constituencies established in 2011